Devil's Den is a 2006 horror film directed by Jeff Burr. It stars Kelly Hu and Devon Sawa.

Plot
A group of pleasure-seeking young adults enter a strip club and discover that it is a Satanic establishment that requires them to check their souls at the door. In order to make it through the night alive, they have to battle with a horde of blood-drinking she-demons whose power is drawn directly from the Lord of the Underworld.

Cast
Kelly Hu as Caitlin
Devon Sawa as Quinn
Ken Foree as Leonard
Steven Schub as Nick
Karen Maxwell as Candy
Dawn Olivieri as  Jezebel
Ken Ohara as Zatoichi

Release
The film was released on DVD by Starz Home Entertainment on February 13, 2007. It was later released by Anchor Bay Entertainment on May 14 that same year.

Reception

Juliet Farmer from DVD Talk gave the film 2.5 out of 5 stars, criticizing the film's dialogue, and cheesy special effects. However, Farmer concluded, "Between the funny dialogue and chemistry between the characters, I was able to overlook the poor attempts at scary effects and enjoy Devil's Den for the light romp it is."

References

External links
 
 
 

2006 films
2006 horror films
American supernatural horror films
Demons in film
Films directed by Jeff Burr
Films about Satanism
2000s English-language films
2000s American films